Jack Payne (born 25 October 1994) is an English professional footballer who plays as a midfielder for Charlton Athletic. He made his professional debut for Southend United in August 2013. After three seasons at Southend he joined Huddersfield Town in June 2016. Payne had loan spells at Oxford United, Blackburn Rovers and Bradford City, before signing for Lincoln City in July 2019. He joined Swindon Town in August 2020, spending two seasons at the Wiltshire club before signing for Charlton Athletic in July 2022.

Club career

Southend United
Payne began his career with Southend United and made his professional debut in a 1–0 defeat against Yeovil Town on 6 August 2013 in the League Cup. On 6 September 2014, Payne scored his first goal for Southend United in a 1–1 draw against Oxford United, opening the scoring in the 36th minute before Danny Hylton's equaliser in the second half.

After an impressive season in which he netted 9 goals in 32 appearances, Payne was voted Southend United's player of the year for the 2015–16 campaign.

Huddersfield Town
On 20 June 2016, Payne joined Championship side Huddersfield Town on a three-year deal. He made his debut for the Terriers in their 2–1 win over Brentford on 6 August 2016. His first goal for the Terriers was the winning goal in the 2–1 win against Newcastle United at St James' Park on 13 August 2016.

Oxford United (loan)
On 28 July 2017, Payne joined League One side Oxford United on a season-long loan. He made his debut against Oldham Athletic in the opening match of the 2017–18 season, which ended in a 2–0 away victory for Oxford, both goals coming from his assists. He scored his first goal for Oxford in an EFL Trophy tie against Stevenage on 29 August 2017. He was recalled by Huddersfield in January 2018, having scored seven goals in 34 appearances in all competitions.

Blackburn Rovers (loan)
On 16 January 2018, Payne was loaned to Blackburn Rovers for the rest of the season.

Bradford City (loan)
On 16 July 2018, Payne was loaned to Bradford City on a season-long loan. He scored on his debut against Shrewsbury Town on the opening day of the 2018–19 season. In December 2018 he was praised by City teammate Hope Akpan. In January 2019 it was announced that his loan would continue until the end of the 2018–19 season, after Bradford reached a new deal with parent club Huddersfield.

Lincoln City
On 3 July 2019, Payne signed for Lincoln City.

Swindon Town
On 6 August 2020, Payne joined Swindon Town. He spent two seasons at the club.

Charlton Athletic
On 18 July 2022, Payne joined Charlton Athletic.

Career statistics

Honours
Southend United
League Two play-offs: 2014–15

Blackburn Rovers
League One runner-up: 2017–18

References

External links

1994 births
Living people
English footballers
Association football midfielders
Southend United F.C. players
Huddersfield Town A.F.C. players
Oxford United F.C. players
Blackburn Rovers F.C. players
Bradford City A.F.C. players
Lincoln City F.C. players
Swindon Town F.C. players
Charlton Athletic F.C. players
English Football League players